Sweet Home is a city in Linn County, Oregon, United States, with population 8,925 at the 2010 census. Built near the site of a prehistoric petrified forest, Sweet Home experienced substantial growth during the construction of the Green Peter and Foster dams in the 1940s.  The town's main attraction nowadays is the Cascade mountains through Santiam Pass.

History 
Settlers first arrived in the Sweet Home Valley in the early 1850s. A community known as Buckhead developed near the mouth of Ames Creek and the South Santiam River. Buckhead was named after a saloon that featured a set of elk antlers on the gable end of its building. East of Buckhead, a community called Mossville developed with a store and post office. In 1874, the two communities merged to become one community called Sweet Home. In 1893, the city of Sweet Home was incorporated.

The Santiam Wagon Road, a toll road connecting the Willamette Valley with central Oregon, was opened in 1865. The road extended from the Sweet Home Valley across the Santiam Pass in the Cascades to Camp Polk near Sisters. The Santiam Wagon Road was a vital means of supplying livestock and goods from western Oregon to central Oregon and transporting wool from east of the Cascades back to Willamette Valley woolen mills. Competition with railroads that extended south from the Columbia River into central Oregon and the newly opened McKenzie Pass Highway made the wagon road obsolete by the late 1930s. U.S. Route 20 was constructed across much of the same route as the Santiam Wagon Road.

Sweet Home experienced significant growth during the 1940s due to the demand for timber from local forests. Further growth occurred when construction began on nearby Green Peter Dam in 1962 and continued as construction began on Foster Dam in 1966.

During the 1980s, Sweet Home experienced a number of sawmill and plywood mill closures due to economic cycles, increased competition, increased productivity, and logging restrictions placed on nearby forests resulting from environmental concerns for endangered species. In response, community members sought out other economic development opportunities such as the Oregon Jamboree country music and camping festival.

Geography

The intersection Oregon Route 228 and U.S. Route 20 occurs at the Western end of Sweet Home.

The South Santiam River flows from Foster Reservoir along the northern city limits of Sweet Home. Ames Creek and Wiley Creek flow into the South Santiam River within the city limits.

Sweet Home is built on a prehistoric petrified forest. In addition to fossil wood, the area includes a variety of agate, jasper, crystals and minerals.  The abundant petrified wood at Holleywood Ranch (between Sweet Home and Holley, Oregon) was the subject of an episode of the Travel Channel program Cash and Treasures.

Climate
The region experiences warm (but not hot) and dry summers, with no average monthly temperatures above .  According to the Köppen Climate Classification system, Sweet Home has a warm-summer Mediterranean climate, abbreviated "Csb" on climate maps.

Demographics

The median income for a household in the city was $43,589; 20.7% of persons were below the poverty line.

2020 census
As of the census of 2020, there were 9,828 people, 3,721 households, and 2,315 families residing in the city. The racial makeup of the city was 93.3% White, 0.3% African American, 1.3% Native American, 0.8% Asian, 0.1% Pacific Islander, 1.1% from other races, and 3.0% from two or more races. Hispanic or Latino of any race were 4.7% of the population.

There were 3,721 households, of which 24.7% had children under the age of 18 living with them, 38.7% were married couples living together, 27.1% had a female householder with no spouse present, and 23.2% had a male householder with no spouse present. 25.7% of all households were made up of individuals, and 11.4% had someone living alone who was 65 years of age or older. The average household size was 2.57 and the average family size was 3.00.

The median age in the city was 39.0 years. 24.7% of residents were under the age of 18. The gender makeup of the city was 51.6% male and 48.4% female.

Economy
Major employers in Sweet Home include Ti Squared Technologies, a titanium foundry; White's Electronics, a metal detector manufacturer; HEVI-Shot, a manufacturer of shotshell ammunition; Cascade Timber Consulting, a timber investment management organization; United States Forest Service, Radiator Supply House, Murphy Plywood, McCool Millworks and the Sweet Home School District.

Arts and culture

Annual cultural events
 Oregon Jamboree

Covered bridges
The Weddle Covered Bridge, relocated from Thomas Creek near Scio, crosses Ames Creek at Sankey Park in Sweet Home.

2018 U.S. Capitol Christmas Tree 
The 2018 Capitol Christmas Tree, which comes from a different national forest every year, was acquired by the Sweet Home Ranger District (it is named after the town in which it is headquartered). The ranger district, part of the Willamette National Forest, was awarded the opportunity to present the tree to the American people for the 2018 Christmas season.

Recreation

Sweet Home has seven city parks within city limits, but most recreational opportunities occur outside of town; the nearby wilderness supports boating, hunting, fishing, hiking, white-water sports, camping and gold panning.  For this reason, Sweet Home describes itself as the "Gateway to the Santiam Playground."

Foster Reservoir on the South Santiam River has boat ramps and a year-round marina while Green Peter Reservoir provides two improved boat ramps. The South Santiam River offers salmon and steelhead fishing while Quartzville Creek is recognized for Class 4 and Class 5 kayaking.

The South Santiam also supports gold panning, and petrified wood deposits nearby continue to draw attention.

Hiking trails include Horse Rock Ridge, Soda Creek Falls Trail at Cascadia State Park and numerous trails throughout the Willamette National Forest. The Menagerie Wilderness has rock faces amenable to climbing.

Transportation
Sweet Home public transportation service is provided by Linn Shuttle.

Education

Sweet Home is served by the Sweet Home School District. The district includes Sweet Home High School, a junior high school and four elementary schools. The district covers Sweet Home, Cascadia, Crawfordsville, Holley, Liberty, Pleasant Valley and other surrounding communities.

Linn–Benton Community College operates a branch campus in Sweet Home.

Media
The New Era newspaper is published weekly. The daily Albany Democrat-Herald also serves the city.

Notable people
People born or who lived in Sweet Home:

 John Arthur Ackroyd (1949-2016), murderer and suspected serial killer; born in Sweet Home
 Howard Bergerson (1922–2011), writer; lived in Sweet Home
 James McCarthy (1944–2019), professor of biological oceanography at Harvard University, recipient of the 2018 Tyler Prize for Environmental Achievement; raised in Sweet Home
 Ritch Price, head baseball coach for the University of Kansas from 2002 to 2022 and the winningest coach in University of Kansas baseball history 
 Matt Slauson (born 1986), offensive lineman, Los Angeles Chargers; attended and played football for Sweet Home High School

References

External links

 Entry for Sweet Home in the Oregon Blue Book

 
Cities in Oregon
Cities in Linn County, Oregon
1874 establishments in Oregon
Populated places established in 1874